Denmark competed at the 1972 Summer Olympics in Munich, West Germany. 126 competitors, 114 men and 12 women, took part in 74 events in 17 sports.

Medalists

Gold
Niels Fredborg — Cycling, Men's 1000 metres time trial

Archery

In the first modern archery competition at the Olympics, Denmark entered two men and two women.  Their highest placing competitor was Arne Jacobsen, at 8th place in the men's competition.

Women's Individual Competition:
 Erna Rahbek Pedersen – 2244 points (→ 26th place)
 Lilli Lentz – 2218 points (→ 29th place)

Men's Individual Competition:
 Arne Jacobsen – 2423 points (→ 8th place)
 Herluf Andersen – 2394 points (→ 13th place)

Athletics

Men's 1500 metres
Tom B. Hansen
 Heat — 3:41.1
 Semifinals — 3:41.6
 Final — 3:46.4 (→ 10th place)
Gerd Larsen
 Heat — 3:44.7
 Semifinals — 3:59.4 (→ did not advance)

Men's 5000 metres
Jørn Lauenbourg
 Heat — 14:18.8 (→ did not advance)
Gert Kaerulin
 Heat — 14:39.2 (→ did not advance)

Boxing

Men's Lightweight (– 60 kg)
Erik Madsen
 First Round — Bye
 Second Round — Lost to Charlie Nash (IRL), 0:5

Men's Welterweight (– 67 kg)
Ib Bøtcher
 First Round — Defeated Nicolas Ortiz Flores (PUR), 3:2
 Second Round — Lost to John Rodgers (IRL), TKO-3

Men's Middleweight (– 75 kg)
Poul Knudsen
 First Round — Bye
 Second Round — Defeated William Peets (ISV), 5:0
 Quarterfinals — Lost to Prince Amartey (GHA), 2:3

Canoeing

Cycling

Thirteen cyclists represented Denmark in 1972.

Individual road race
 Jørgen Marcussen — 21st place
 Ove Jensen — 28th place
 Henning Jørgensen — 48th place
 Eigil Sørensen — did not finish (→ no ranking)

Team time trial
 Jørgen Emil Hansen
 Junker Jørgensen
 Jørn Lund
 Jørgen Marcussen

Sprint
 Niels Fredborg
 Peder Pedersen

1000m time trial
 Niels Fredborg
 Final — 1:06.44 (→  Gold Medal)

Individual pursuit
 Reno Olsen

Team pursuit
 Gunnar Asmussen
 Svend Erik Bjerg
 Reno Olsen
 Bent Pedersen

Equestrian

Fencing

Six fencers, five men and one woman, represented Denmark in 1972.

Men's épée
 Reinhard Münster
 Peter Askjær-Friis
 Ivan Kemnitz

Men's team épée
 Torben Bjerre-Poulsen, Peter Askjær-Friis, Ivan Kemnitz, Reinhard Münster, Jørgen Thorup

Women's foil
 Annie Madsen

Football

Men's Team Competition
First Round (Group C)
 Defeated Brazil (3-2)
 Defeated Iran (4-0)
 Lost to Hungary (0-2)
Second Round (Group 2)
 Drew with Poland (1-1)
 Defeated Morocco (3-1)
 Lost to Soviet Union (0-4) → did not advance, 5th place over-all
 Team Roster
 Flemming Ahlberg, BK Frem
 Svend Andresen, B 1903
 Keld Bak, Næstved IF
 Hans Ewald Hansen, B 1901
 Heino Hansen, Slagelse B&I
 Jack Hansen, B 1913
 Heinz Hildebrandt, Hvidovre IF
 Kristen Nygaard, Fuglebakken Aarhus
 Flemming Pedersen, KB
 Leif Printzlau, BK Frem
 Jørgen Rasmussen, Randers Freja
 Max Rasmussen, AB
 Per Røntved, Brønshøj BK
 Allan Simonsen, Vejle BK
 Mogens Therkildsen, Odense BK (goalkeeper)
 Steen Ziegler, Hvidovre IF
 Reserve: Kurt Berthelsen, Aalborg BK
 Reserve: Valdemar Hansen, BK Frem (goalkeeper)
 Reserve: Helge Vonsyld, Randers Freja
Head Coach: Rudi Strittich

Gymnastics

Handball

Men's Team Competition
Preliminary Round (Group A)
 Drew with the Soviet Union (12-12)
 Lost to Poland (8-11)
 Lost to Sweden (10-16)
Final Round
 Defeated Tunisia (29-21)
 Defeated United States (19-18) → 13th place
 Team Roster
 Arne Andersen
 Keld Jul Andersen
 Jørgen Frandsen
 Claus Jørgen From
 Flemming Hansen
 Jørgen Heidemann
 Søren Jensen
 Bent Jørgensen
 Kay Sloth Jørgensen
 Flemming Lauritzen
 Svend Otto Lund
 Tom Benny Lund
 Thor Munkager
 Vagn Harris Nielsen
 Karsten Steen Sørensen
 Jørgen Vodsgaard

Modern pentathlon

Three male pentathletes represented Denmark in 1972.

Men's Individual Competition
 Jørn Steffensen – 4887 points (→ 14th place)
 Klaus Petersen – 4492 points (→ 37th place)
 René Heitmann – 4190 points (→ 52nd place)

Men's Team Competition
 Steffensen, Petersen, and Heitmann – 13547 points (→ 14th place)

Rowing

Men's Single Sculls
Kim Børgesen
Heat — 7:58.94
Repechage — 7:56.66
Semi Finals — 8:27.93
B-Final — 8:09.04 (→ 11th place)

Sailing

Open

Shooting

Seven male shooters represented Denmark in 1972.

25 m pistol
 Lennart Christensen

300 m rifle, three positions
 Vagn Andersen
 Per Weichel

50 m rifle, three positions
 Henning Clausen
 Per Weichel

50 m rifle, prone
 Henning Clausen
 Vagn Andersen

Trap
 Egon Hansen

Skeet
 Niels-Ove Mikkelsen
 Ole Justesen

Swimming

Men's 100m Backstroke
Ejvind Pedersen
Lars Børgesen

Men's 200m Backstroke
Ejvind Pedersen
Lars Børgesen

Men's 100m Breaststroke
Karl Christian Koch

Men's 200m Breaststroke
Karl Christian Koch

Women's 100m Freestyle
Kirsten Strange-Campbell

Women's 400m Freestyle
Kirsten Knudsen

Women's 800m Freestyle
Kirsten Knudsen

Women's 100m Breaststroke
Winnie Nielsen

Women's 200m Breaststroke
Winnie Nielsen

Women's 200m Individual Medley
Kirsten Strange-Campbell

Women's 400m Individual Medley
Kirsten Strange-Campbell

Weightlifting

Wrestling

References

Nations at the 1972 Summer Olympics
1972 Summer Olympics
Summer Olympics